Arthur John Cobain (2 November 1880 – 29 August 1941) was an Australian rules footballer who played for the St Kilda Football Club in the Victorian Football League (VFL).

Notes

External links 

1880 births
1941 deaths
Australian rules footballers from Victoria (Australia)
St Kilda Football Club players